The Man Who Defended Gavrilo Princip is a 2014 Serbian film directed by Srđan Koljević. It was one of six films shortlisted by Serbia to be their submission for the Academy Award for Best Foreign Language Film at the 88th Academy Awards, but it lost out to Enclave.

The film is based on the true story of the assassination of Archduke Franz Ferdinand of Austria.

Cast

References

External links 

2014 drama films
Films about the assassination of Archduke Franz Ferdinand of Austria
Serbian drama films
World War I films
Films set in the 1910s
Courtroom films
Films about assassinations
Cultural depictions of Gavrilo Princip
Films set in Sarajevo